Lydia Akoth (born 22 September 1994) is a Kenyan footballer who plays as a midfielder for Thika Queens FC and the Kenya women's national team.

International career
Akoth played for Kenya at the 2016 Africa Women Cup of Nations.

See also
List of Kenya women's international footballers

References

1994 births
Living people
People from Kisumu County
Kenyan women's footballers
Women's association football midfielders
Kenya women's international footballers